{| class="wikitable floatright" style="text-align: center"
! colspan=4 style="text-align:center;border-top:none;"| Demographics (2010)
|-
! Demographic
! Proportion
|-
| White|86.8%
|-
| Black|5.4%
|-
| Asian| 2.8%
|-
| Islander|0.0%
|-
| Native|0.2%
|-
| Other|4.8%
|-
| Hispanic(any race)|10.6%
|}Schererville'  is a town in St. John Township, Lake County, Indiana,  United States. The population was 29,646 at the 2020 census  It is a suburb of Chicago, located 30 miles south of the city.

 History 
Long before Indiana became a state, long before the founding of Schererville, people called the area the "Crossroads,"  as several Native American trails intersected here, that later became routes for the wagons of settlers traveling west.

One of those settlers was Nicholas Scherer, who was born in 1830 at Scheuern, today part of Tholey, Saarland, in southwestern Germany, who arrived in the U.S. in 1846. When he came to this place at the southern tip of Lake Michigan in 1865, he founded the community that bears his name.

Today, trails still cross at Schererville, the modern trails of a motorized society, U.S. Highways 41 and 30. Nearby are newer trails, I-80/94 and I-65. All these are primary transcontinental routes and gives Schererville its slogan: "Crossroads of the Nation."

The town was named one of the "100 Best Places to Live in the U.S." by Money Magazine in 2007.

Schererville's former Town Council President, Perry Ferrini, died on December 13, 2009.  The Town Council's new president became Jerry Tippy, and the vacant seat held by Perry was filled by Sharon Moore on January 9, 2010.

The town of Schererville celebrated its sesquicentennial in September, 2016.

Geography
Schererville is located at  (41.489135, -87.443137) in Lake County, Indiana. Schererville is 11 miles south of the Lake Michigan shore and 2 miles east of the Indiana/Illinois state line.

Considered part of the Chicago metropolitan area and located just 30 miles from Chicago, Schererville is considered a suburb of this municipality. Many residents commute daily for school and work.

One of Schererville's neighborhoods, Briar Ridge, spans both Schererville and adjacent Dyer.
The ridge south of Route 30 is the Glenwood Shoreline.

Demographics

2010 census
As of the census of 2010, there were 29,243 people, 11,883 households, and 7,981 families living in the town. The racial makeup of the town was 86.8% White, 5.4% African American, 0.2% Native American, 2.8% Asian, 2.9% from other races, and 1.8% from two or more races. Hispanic or Latino of any race were 10.6% of the population.

There were 11,883 households, of which 29.8% had children under the age of 18 living with them, 53.3% were married couples living together, 9.7% had a female householder with no husband present, 4.2% had a male householder with no wife present, and 32.8% were non-families. 27.7% of all households were made up of individuals, and 9.2% had someone living alone who was 65 years of age or older. The average household size was 2.45 and the average family size was 3.03.

The median age in the town was 40.9 years. 22.1% of residents were under the age of 18; 7.7% were between the ages of 18 and 24; 25.9% were from 25 to 44; 30.3% were from 45 to 64; and 14% were 65 years of age or older. The gender makeup of the town was 48.5% male and 51.5% female.

As of 2010, the median income for a household in the town was $66,160 while the mean income for a household in the town was $77,738. The median income for a family was $84,507 and the mean income for a family was $92,404. The estimated per capita income for the town was $31,983. About 4.3% of families and 7.1% of the population were estimated to be below the poverty line.

2000 census
As of the census of 2000, there were 24,851 people, 9,660 households, and 6,829 families living in the town. The racial makeup of the town was 91.45% White, 2.14% African American, 0.11% Native American, 2.56% Asian, 0.04% Pacific Islander, 2.03% from other races, and 1.66% from two or more races. Hispanic or Latino of any race were 6.34% of the population.

There were 9,660 households, out of which 32.6% had children under the age of 18 living with them, 59.0% were married couples living together, 8.3% had a female householder with no husband present, and 29.3% were non-families. 24.2% of all households were made up of individuals, and 6.5% had someone living alone who was 65 years of age or older. The average household size was 2.56 and the average family size was 3.08.

In the town, the population was spread out, with 24.3% under the age of 18, 8.7% from 18 to 24, 30.6% from 25 to 44, 26.1% from 45 to 64, and 10.4% who were 65 years of age or older. The median age was 37 years. For every 100 females, there were 96.7 males. For every 100 females age 18 and over, there were 92.9 males.

The median income for a household in the town was $59,243, and the median income for a family was $70,474. Males had a median income of $50,732 versus $30,745 for females. The per capita income for the town was $28,528. About 1.4% of families and 3.1% of the population were below the poverty line, including 1.9% of those under age 18 and 2.2% of those age 65 or over.

Education
Schererville is served by the Lake Central School Corporation, which also services the adjacent towns of St. John and Dyer.List of schools - Lake Central School Corporation:Lake Central High School (St. John)
Grimmer Middle School
Kahler Middle School (Dyer)
Clark Middle School (St. John)
Peifer Elementary
Bibich Elementary (Dyer)
Kolling Elementary (St. John)
Homan Elementary
Protsman Elementary (Dyer)
Watson Elementary
St. Michael School

Private schools in the town include St. Michael Catholic School, a Roman Catholic school run by the Diocese of Gary and the Forest Ridge Academy. The campus of Hammond Baptist Schools, affiliated with the First Baptist Church of Hammond, is also located in Schererville. Other private schools Schererville residents attend include Andrean High School (Merrillville), Bishop Noll Institute (Hammond), St. John Evangelist School (St. John), Illiana Christian High School (Dyer), Marian Catholic High School (Chicago Heights, IL), and Mount Carmel High School (Chicago, IL)

Public libraries
Lake County Public Library operates the Dyer-Schererville Branch, which also serves Dyer, at 1001 West Lincoln Highway in Schererville.

Newspaper
Schererville is served by The Times of Northwest Indiana,  and The Post-Tribune, which is owned by the Chicago Tribune''.

Recreational sports
The Schererville Soccer Club provides a soccer environment for boys and girls ages 4–17 (U6 through REC Plus.)

There is also Tri-Town Football for ages going all the way to 15 or 16 years of age.

Transportation
Schererville residents and visitors fly via Chicago's O'Hare International or Midway.

The Borman Expressway (I-80/94/US 6), the Indiana Toll Road, Interstate 65, US 12 and US 20 are within a  radius of Schererville.

Commuters to nearby Chicago rely on local South Shore Line with train service from Millennium Station in Chicago to the South Bend International Airport in South Bend, IN. In 2014 an extensive expansion and improvement project was started to improve reliability, frequency and efficiency for daily commuters. Completion of this upgraded service is expected in 2024.

Nickname
The town's nickname, "The Crossroads of America," stems from the fact that U.S. Route 41, (stemming from Upper Peninsula Michigan to Miami, Florida) U.S. Route 30, (stemming from Atlantic City, New Jersey to Astoria, Oregon) and the old Lincoln Highway (the east end starting in Times Square and the west end starting in Lincoln Park in San Francisco, CA) intersect in Schererville.

Notable residents

Tyler Wideman (born 1995), American basketball player in the Israeli National League

References

External links

 Town of Schererville, Indiana website

Northwest Indiana
Towns in Indiana
Chicago metropolitan area
Towns in Lake County, Indiana
Populated places established in 1866
1866 establishments in Indiana